Centennial is a home rule municipality located in Arapahoe County, Colorado, United States. The city population was 108,418 at the 2020 United States Census, making Centennial the 11th most populous municipality in Colorado. Centennial is a part of the Denver–Aurora–Lakewood, CO Metropolitan Statistical Area and the Front Range Urban Corridor.

History
Centennial was formed on February 7, 2001, from portions of unincorporated Arapahoe County, including the former Castlewood and Southglenn census-designated places (CDPs). The citizens of the area had voted to incorporate on September 12, 2000, choosing Centennial as the official name during the vote. The name reflects Colorado's admission to the Union as the 38th state in 1876, the centennial year of the United States Declaration of Independence. The state of Colorado is nicknamed the "Centennial State".

Incorporation was approved by 77% of the voters, and the population of the area at over 100,000 made it the largest incorporation in U.S. history as of its creation. The city was incorporated in large part to prevent further annexations of unincorporated areas by the city of Greenwood Village in an attempt to improve its tax base. The taxes generated from businesses in unincorporated portions of Arapahoe County funded the majority of the county's services, including road work. A number of court cases eventually established the right of incorporation to take precedence over the right of annexation.

The city was incorporated on a promise to keep city taxes at 1%. (One of the campaigns against incorporation appealed to voters to maintain the 3.8% sales tax of the unincorporated county.) According to the Centennial website, the current sales tax rate is two-and-a-half times the promised rate, at 2.5%.

Since the city is relatively new, some people in the Denver-Aurora metropolitan area do not yet recognize the area by the name "Centennial", especially since neighboring Aurora, Englewood and Littleton are the default place names assigned by the United States Postal Service for ZIP codes serving Centennial. Thus, mailing addresses designated as "Aurora", "Englewood" or "Littleton" may actually be located in Centennial. This causes considerable confusion, as Centennial and Englewood do not even share a boundary, while some portions of Centennial are surrounded by Aurora and vice versa.

In 2008, Centennial voters approved a referendum by approximately a 2-to-1 margin making Centennial a home rule city.

Centennial Airport, formerly Arapahoe County Airport, lies adjacent to Centennial, but is located in unincorporated Arapahoe County. The airport is not named after the city, as it predates the city by over 30 years.

Geography
Centennial is roughly divided in half by Interstate 25, with most of its business and entertainment centers lying west of the highway. The city's boundaries are highly irregular and evocative of a gerrymander, particularly the overwhelmingly residential eastern portions of the city, which appear with Foxfield, portions of Aurora, and unincorporated areas as a distorted checkerboard on the city's map.

Centennial has many hills, gullies and ravines, and its open spaces are usually accompanied by recreational trails and parks, including Dry Creek Dam, DeKoevend Park, the High line Canal Trail, Willow Creek Trail, as well as Big Dry Creek and Little Dry Creek Trails. Centennial hosts most native wildlife and is a good reflection of Colorado's front range ecosystem. Centennial has seen a boost in coyote populations in recent years, leading to resident education on how to deter coyotes from eating family pets.

Centennial is located at 39°35'47" North, 104°50'38" West (39.5963, −104.8439).

At the 2020 United States Census, the city had a total area of  including  of water.

Demographics

The city is approximately composed of 87.4% White, 4.8% Hispanic or Latino, 3.6% Asian, 2.4% African American, 0.4% Native American, and 0.3% from other races.

The median age is 37.2 years, in comparison to the 35.3-year national average. For every 100 females, there are 98 males.

Economy
National CineMedia and United Launch Alliance are among the companies based in Centennial. Blackjack Pizza was headquartered in Centennial.

Top employers
According to Centennial's 2017 Comprehensive Annual Financial Report, the top employers in the city are:

Schools
Most of Centennial is within the territory of the Cherry Creek Public Schools while the western portion of the city in the territory of Littleton Public Schools. Centennial is also served by a few private schools.

Private Elementary and Middle Schools
St. Thomas More Parish School
Highlands Baptist Academy
Shepherd of the Hills Christian School
Centennial Christian Academy
C.A.R.E. Middle School

Seminary
Gateway Seminary

Government

The city is governed under the council-manager form of government which limits the power of the city to levy and collect taxes. The city council has eight members. The Mayor and Council Members are all part-time officials who hold other full-time jobs.

Points of interest
International Headquarters for Gamma Phi Beta sorority  are located in Centennial. Gamma Phi Beta was the first women's organization to use the term "sorority".
Centennial was chosen in 2008 as the site of the first IKEA store in Colorado. The IKEA Centennial location opened on July 27, 2011. It is the second-largest IKEA store in the United States. IKEA Centennial was awarded the Project of the Year in 2011 by city of Centennial.
Centennial is home to the headquarters of the National Cattlemen's Beef Association (NCBA). NCBA also maintains an office in Washington, D.C.
Centennial is home to the headquarters of Arrow Electronics and the is the largest company headquartered in Colorado.

Notable people
Notable individuals who were born in or have lived in Centennial include:
 Sean Tufts (1982–), football, linebacker for the Carolina Panthers
 Amy Barczuk (1990–), soccer defender, midfielder
 Madisen Beaty (1995–), actress
 Melissa Benoist (1988–), actress
 Kevin Gausman (1991–), baseball pitcher
 Kenny McKinley (1987–2010), football wide receiver
 George Ratterman (1926–2007), football quarterback
 Spencer Swalm (1951–), Colorado state legislator
 Jack Tate (1963–), Colorado state legislator
 Ken Tribbett (1991–), soccer defender, midfielder
 Tom Costello (1963–), NBC NEWS Washington-based correspondent

Surrounding municipalities

See also

Colorado
Bibliography of Colorado
Index of Colorado-related articles
Outline of Colorado
List of counties in Colorado
List of municipalities in Colorado
List of places in Colorado
List of statistical areas in Colorado
Front Range Urban Corridor
North Central Colorado Urban Area
Denver-Aurora, CO Combined Statistical Area
Denver-Aurora-Lakewood, CO Metropolitan Statistical Area

References

External links

Centennial website
CDOT map of Centennial

 
Cities in Arapahoe County, Colorado
Cities in Colorado
Denver metropolitan area
Populated places established in 2001
2001 establishments in Colorado